Chen Fujin (born May 1941) is a Chinese politician who served as party secretary of the Chinese Academy of Governance from 1999 to 2006. He was a member of the 15th CCP Central Commission for Discipline Inspection, a member of the Standing Committee of the 11th Chinese People's Political Consultative Conference, and a member of the 16th Central Committee of the Chinese Communist Party.

Early life and education
Chen was born in Shiping County, Yunnan, in May 1941. In 1960, he was admitted to Peking University, majoring in philosophy. He joined the Chinese Communist Party (CCP) in July 1965. Two months later, he was assigned to the Political Department of the Ministry of Culture as an official. He worked at May Seventh Cadre School in Xianning, Hubei between 1969 and 1971. In March 1971, he was recalled to Beijing and was despatched to Beijing Chemical Research Institute, an institute affiliated to China Petrochemical Corporation.

Ministry of Coal Industry
He was editor-in-chief of China Coal News in December 1982, and held that office until March 1986.

General Office of the Chinese Communist Party
In March 1986, he was despatched to the General Office of the Chinese Communist Party, where he was eventually promoted to deputy director in May 1993.

Chinese Academy of Governance
He was appointed party secretary of the Chinese Academy of Governance in December 1999, concurrently holding the executive vice president position.

Chinese People's Political Consultative Conference
In March 2008, he became chairperson of the Culture, History and Study Committee of the Chinese People's Political Consultative Conference, a post he kept until his retirement in March 2013.

References

1941 births
Living people
People from Shiping County
Peking University alumni
Central Party School of the Chinese Communist Party alumni
People's Republic of China politicians from Yunnan
Chinese Communist Party politicians from Yunnan
Members of the 16th Central Committee of the Chinese Communist Party
Members of the Standing Committee of the 11th Chinese People's Political Consultative Conference